Keith Shologan (born November 26, 1985) is a Canadian football defensive tackle for the Montreal Alouettes of the Canadian Football League (CFL). He played college football at UCF. Shologan has also been a member of the San Diego Chargers, Saskatchewan Roughriders, Ottawa Redblacks and Winnipeg Blue Bombers.

College career
Shologan spent four seasons at the University of Central Florida and also started all four years on the Knights' defensive line. As a senior in 2007, he recorded 33 tackles and 2.5 sacks. His performance earned him All-Conference USA second-team honours.

Professional career

San Diego Chargers 
Shologan was considered a top pick in the 2008 CFL Draft and a possible pick of the Edmonton Eskimos along with Dimitri Tsoumpas and Samuel Giguere. However Shologan signed with the San Diego Chargers. He attended the Chargers training camp; however, he was cut on June 21.

Saskatchewan Roughriders 
A week after he was cut by San Diego he signed with the Saskatchewan Roughriders of the Canadian Football League (CFL). He joined Saskatchewan in week eight after they drafted him with the fourth pick in the 2008 draft. He appeared in one game as a backup defensive lineman against the Edmonton Eskimos and recorded two tackles. The Roughriders lost Shologan's debut by a score of 27–10. During the Roughriders 2009 training camp, Shologan was called a "standout" by head coach Ken Miller, and when told about Miller's comments, Shologan responded by saying "aw shucks".  On August 16, 2009, Shologan scored his first ever CFL touchdown against the Hamilton Tiger-Cats as a tight end on a 1-yard reception in the end zone from Steven Jyles. After the 2010 Grey Cup, Shologan was named the game's Top Canadian for his performance, despite the Roughriders loss to the Montreal Alouettes.

Ottawa Redblacks 
On December 16, 2013, Shologan was drafted by the Ottawa Redblacks (CFL) in the 2013 CFL Expansion Draft. Shologan played with the Redbacks in their inaugural season, and their second season, before leaving in free-agency in February 2016. During his time in Ottawa he played in 34 games, amassing 41 tackles and 8 quarterback sacks.

Winnipeg Blue Bombers 
On February 9, 2016, Shologan signed with the Winnipeg Blue Bombers (CFL). In one season in Winnipeg he contributed with 22 tackles and 2 sacks over 18 games. He was released by the Bombers prior to free agency on January 31, 2017.

Montreal Alouettes 
The following day (February 1, 2017) Shologan signed a two-year deal with the Montreal Alouettes (CFL).

Personal
Shologan lives on a bull farm with his family in Northern Alberta near a town called Westlock during the off-season and he enjoys playing squash in his spare time. His two younger sisters died in 2001, when Shologan was 15.

References

External links
 Winnipeg Blue Bombers bio 
 Ottawa Redblacks bio

1985 births
Living people
American football defensive linemen
Canadian football defensive linemen
Ottawa Redblacks players
People from Spruce Grove
Players of Canadian football from Alberta
San Diego Chargers players
Saskatchewan Roughriders players
UCF Knights football players
Winnipeg Blue Bombers players